Nannau may refer to:

Nannau, Maine, a country estate in Maine, U.S.A.
Nannau, Gwynedd a mansion in Wales, U.K.